Angelica Segerbäck ("Angel") (born in Stockholm, 22 June 1982) is lead vocalist in the bands Waves under Water and LinaLaukaR which she and Johan Svärdshammar started together. She has also appeared on a few songs by other bands.

In 2007, Segerbäck was asked by Johan Svärdshammar if she would be interested in trying to sing to a few of his songs. Having long dreamed of forming a band and singing she gladly accepted. They recorded two songs during one day and were both very happy with the result. Thus the band was formed.

Discography
Waves under Water

Albums
All of Your Light – (CD Album) 2011 – Danse Macabre
Serpents and the Tree – (CD Album) 2009 – Calorique Records, Danse Macabre
A Short Presentation of – (Demo) 2009
Winter Garden – (Demo) 2008

Singles
Tomorrow – (digital) 2011
Red Red Star – (digital) 2010
Winter Garden – (digital) 2009

Compilation appearances
Dark Alliance vol. 3 – (CD) 2009, Track No. 1 "Serpents and the Tree" – Danse Macabre
New Signs & Sounds 11/09 – (CD) 2009, Track No. 2 "Serpents and the Tree" – Zillo
Sonic Seducer Cold Hands Seduction Vol. 100 (CD) 2009, Track No. 7 "Winter Garden" – Sonic Seducer
Gothic Lifestyle 3 (CD) November 2009, Track No. 13 "Serpents and the Tree" – Gothic Magazine
EXTREME traumfänger 10 (CD) December 2009, Track No. 9 "Nothing More" – UpScene
Die Zillo-CD 05/2010 (CD) April 2010, Track No. 15 "Red Red Star" – Zillo
Dark Alliance vol. 7 – (CD) 2010, Track No. 8 "Red Red Star" – Danse Macabre

LinaLaukaR

Albums
LinaLaukaR – (Demo) 2009

Other recordings
2010 "God appears", "Den bergtagna" – Stormfågel
2010 "I fall in love" (Swedish speech)- Nouvelle Culture
2012 "Each Day is a Shadow" – Sagitario

See also
Waves under Water
LinaLaukaR
Johan Svärdshammar
List of vegans

References

External links
Waves under Water – Official MySpace.com profile
LinaLaukaR – Official Soundcloud profile

1982 births
Living people
21st-century Swedish singers
21st-century Swedish women singers